The LeRoy Sanitarium, later called the LeRoy Hospital, was a medical facility in New York, New York.  It was founded in 1928 by Alice Fuller LeRoy and closed in 1980.

Notable patients
actress Marguerite Clark entered as a patient and then died there in 1940.
actress Laura Hope Crews died there in 1942 following treatment for liver problems.
actress Doris Keane died there of cancer in 1945.
actress Dorothy Kilgallen had her final birth there in 1953. The baby was named Kerry Kollmar after the father, Richard Kollmar.
jazz musician Dick McDonough died there in 1938.
businesswoman Christina Onassis was born there in 1950.
actress Dixie Carter's daughters, Ginna and Mary Dixie, were born there.

References

Hospital buildings completed in 1928
Defunct hospitals in Manhattan
Hospitals established in 1928
Hospitals disestablished in 1980
1928 establishments in New York City
1980 disestablishments in New York (state)